Josh Lamberson (born September 1, 1982) is an American football coach and former player. He is the head football coach at the University of Central Missouri, a position he had held since 2022. He was previously the assistant head football coach and offensive coordinator at Abilene Christian University in Abilene, Texas. Prior to taking this position on December 21, 2016, he served as the head football coach at the University of Nebraska at Kearney in Kearney, Nebraska. Lamberson was announced as the new head coach on December 14, 2014, replacing Darrell Morris. Before becoming head coach at UNK, Lamberson served as the offensive coordinator at Central Missouri from 2010 to 2014. He served as a graduate assistant at Northwest Missouri State from 2006 to 2008, and as the offensive coordinator and recruiting coach at Southeastern Oklahoma State from 2008 to 2010.

Playing career
Lamberson was an All-American quarterback for Northwest Missouri State, leading the Bearcats to the National Championship game in 2005. Lamberson was also the ESPN Academic All-American Football National Player of the Year in 2005 as a senior, as well as the Disney Sportsman of the Year. Lamberson won the Ken B. Jones Award as the MIAA's top male student-athlete in 2005, as well.

Personal life
Lamberson and his wife, his wife, Mandy, have a two-year-old daughter, Kiya and a newborn son, Ace.

Head coaching record

References

External links
 Central Missouri profile
 Abilene Christian profile

1982 births
Living people
American football quarterbacks
Abilene Christian Wildcats football coaches
Central Missouri Mules football coaches
Nebraska–Kearney Lopers football coaches
Northwest Missouri State Bearcats football coaches
Southeastern Oklahoma State Savage Storm football coaches
People from Wilber, Nebraska